Matthew McShane (born 1 November 1990) is a 1.5 point wheelchair basketball player from Australia. He was a member of the Rollers team that competed at the 2020 Summer Paralympics, his second Games.

Biography 
Matthew McShane was born on 1 November 1990. When he was 18, he contracted transverse myelitis,  a neurological condition in which the spinal cord is inflamed, that left him paraplegic. Coming home from his work one day, he suddenly found that he was unable to move. He was in hospital and rehabilitation for nine months.

He has completed a Bachelor of Industrial Design at the Gold Coast campus of Griffith University.

Basketball 
McShane had always enjoyed sports, particularly Australian football, surfing and Skateboarding. During rehabilitation, he was introduced to wheelchair basketball, and played his first game in a social competition on the Gold Coast. He then joined the Queensland Spinning Bullets the National Wheelchair Basketball League (NWBL) as a 1.5 point player, and played his first game with the  national team, the Rollers, in November 2014. In June 2016, he toured Great Britain for the 2016 Continental Clash against Canada, Great Britain, Japan, the Netherlands and the United States. The Rollers were defeated by the United States, and won silver.  In 2016, he was selected for the 2016 Summer Paralympics in Rio de Janeiro. He was one of five Rollers selected for their first Paralympics  where they finished sixth.

In 2018, he was a member of the Rollers that won the bronze medal at 2018 Wheelchair Basketball World Championship in Hamburg, Germany.

At the 2020 Tokyo Paralympics, the Rollers finished fifth with a win–loss record of 4–4.

References

External links

Basketball Australia Profile

1990 births
Living people
Paralympic wheelchair basketball players of Australia
Wheelchair basketball players at the 2016 Summer Paralympics
Wheelchair basketball players at the 2020 Summer Paralympics